Space Vacation is the seventh album released by New York City based Japanese punk group Peelander-Z, released on April 10, 2012.  This album strays away from the band's Ramones influenced punk rock, towards a new wave sound prominently featuring keyboards, similar to Devo.  Peelander-Z toured throughout 2012 to promote the album, with advanced copies of it for sale at the shows.

Track listing
"Intro"  – 1:58
"Space Vacation"  – 3:56
"Under Zero Gravity" – 1:22
"Galaxy Smile" – 2:22
"Star Bowling" – 4:20
"Mr. Tea" – 4:01
"Big Bang" – 1:04
"K.M.G.T." – 0:29
"P-Radio" – 0:59
"Girls Just Want To Have Fun"  (Cyndi Lauper cover)– 3:01
"Space Kiss" – 2:27
"Get Glasses" – 3:30
"Love Love Peelander-Z" – 4:43
"Sa Yo Na La-La" – 3:02
"Outro" – 1:46

References

2012 albums
Peelander-Z albums